Jesús Esperanza (born 17 August 1960) is a Spanish foil fencer. He competed at the 1980, 1988 and 1992 Summer Olympics.

References

External links
 

1960 births
Living people
Spanish male foil fencers
Olympic fencers of Spain
Fencers at the 1980 Summer Olympics
Fencers at the 1988 Summer Olympics
Fencers at the 1992 Summer Olympics
Fencers from Madrid